Love Crimes of Kabul is a 2011 documentary film following select cases of inmates at Badam Bagh women's prison in Kabul, Afghanistan, where half are jailed for "moral crimes" such as adultery, premarital sex and running away from home. "If they were good women, they wouldn't be here," says a prison guard at the beginning of the film.

Cases
Kareema, 20 and pregnant, has been in prison for two months awaiting trial for the crime of pre-marital sex with fiancé Firuz. She faces up to 15 years in prison.
Aleema, 23, ran away from her violent family and sought refuge with Zia Jaan, another woman. They have been in prison three months. Aleema accuses Zia of trying to prostitute her, which Zia denies. Aleema is facing up to 15 years for running away; Zia Jaan up to 20 years for housing her and attempting to sell her.
Sabereh, 18, is accused of having anal sex with a neighbor. She was turned in by her father. Medical exam showed she is still a virgin.

See also
No Burqas Behind Bars, a 2013 documentary about life in the Takhar Prison women's prison in Afghanistan

References

External links
HBO - Official Site of Love Crimes of Kabul
Love Crimes of Kabul - hotdocs.ca

2011 films
2011 documentary films
Documentary films about women in Afghanistan
Documentary films about violence against women
Documentary films about law
Documentary films about the penal system
Violence against women in Afghanistan
Penal system in Afghanistan
HBO documentary films
2010s American films